CKBW-FM is a Canadian radio station broadcasting at 98.1 FM in Bridgewater, Nova Scotia. The station also operates in Liverpool at 94.5 and in Shelburne at 93.1. The station plays a classic hits format branded as CKBW. CKBW is owned & operated by Acadia Broadcasting which also owns sister station CJHK-FM.

History
CKBW's first broadcast was at AM 1000 on December 24, 1947, under local ownership. In 1949, Acadia Broadcasting hired Jamie Macleod an announcer from CHNS, who had returned to announcing duties after serving in the RCAF as a Spitfire pilot. His assignment was Program Director and Operations Manager. In 1950, while still in high school in Bridgewater, the actor Donald Sutherland was hired by Jamie McLeod as a part-time announcer at CKBW for 60 cents an hour. In the summer of 1953 Sutherland left CKBW and headed for the University of Toronto to study engineering. In 1967, the station moved from King Street to new studios and offices specially constructed on the second floor of the Bridgewater Shopping Plaza. In 1996, Bob MacLaren, former station general manager was inducted in the Canadian Association of Broadcasters Hall Of Fame. In 1999, Jamie MacLeod was inducted in the Canadian Association of Broadcasters Hall of Fame.

In 2001, CKBW flipped to the FM band at 98.1 MHz. The station changed formats numerous times. For much of the 1990s, CKBW played primarily country music until an official format change in 2001 to adopt an adult contemporary format.

On June 5, 2020 CKBW flipped to classic hits branded using its call letters.

References

External links
CKBW website

Kbw
Kbw
Kbw
Bridgewater, Nova Scotia
Radio stations established in 1947
1947 establishments in Nova Scotia